This is a list of Danish television related events from 2003.

Events
2 March - Thomas Bickham is voted winner of Big Brother - V.I.P.
September - The Danish version of Pop Idol debuts on TV2.
17 December - Christian Mendoza wins the first season of Idols.

Debuts

September - Idols (2003-2004)

Television shows

1990s
Hvem vil være millionær? (1999–present)

2000s
Big Brother (2001-2005, 2012-2014)

Births

Deaths

See also
 2003 in Denmark